Sticky thread may refer to:

A prioritized sticky thread or pinned thread in Internet forums
A track in the Gorilla Manor album by the indie rock band Local Natives
A thin material known for its stickiness such as spider silk